Syd-Österbotten ("South Ostrobothnia") is a Swedish-language newspaper published in Närpes and Kristinestad in Finland. It is owned by HSS Media and is published three times a week.

The history of the newspaper goes back to 1897 when Kristinestads Tidning was founded. After the closure of Kristinestads Tidning by the Russian authorities in 1900, the new newspaper Syd-Österbotten was founded in 1903.

The current editor of Syd-Österbotten is Mats Ekman.

References

External links
 Syd-Österbotten
 HSS Media

1903 establishments in Finland
Publications established in 1903
Swedish-language newspapers published in Finland